Patrick Hoban (born 1968) is an Irish hurling manager and former player. At club level he lined out with Mullinavat and was also a member of the Kilkenny senior hurling team. Hoban later served as a manager with various Kilkenny teams.

Playing career

Born in Mullinavat, County Kilkenny, Hoban first came to prominence at juvenile and underage levels with the local club. He eventually joined the club's top adult team and was a member of their County Intermediate Championship-winning teams in 1989 and 2001. Hoban first appeared on the inter-county scene as a member of the Kilkenny minor team in 1986 before later winning a Leinster Championship medal with the under-21 team in 1988. He made a number of National League appearances with the Kilkenny senior hurling team and was an unused substitute on the 1992 All-Ireland Championship-winning team. Hoban was also a two-time All-Ireland-winner with the Kilkenny junior team.

Managerial career

After his retirement from playing, Hoban first became involved in club management before a four-year stint as manager of the Kilkenny intermediate team. During this period he guided the team to four successive All-Ireland final appearances, with Kilkenny claiming the titles in 2008 and 2010. During a subsequent four-year period as Kilkenny minor manager, Hoban won the All-Ireland Championship title in 2014.

Honours

Player

Mullinavat
Kilkenny Intermediate Hurling Championship: 1989, 2001

Kilkenny
All-Ireland Senior Hurling Championship: 1992
Leinster Senior Hurling Championship: 1992
All-Ireland Junior Hurling Championship: 1990, 1995
Leinster Junior Hurling Championship: 1990, 1995
Leinster Under-21 Hurling Championship: 1988

Manager

Ballyhale Shamrocks
All-Ireland Senior Club Hurling Championship: 2023

Leinster Senior Club Hurling Championship: 2022

Kilkenny Senior Hurling Championship: 2022

Kilkenny
All-Ireland Intermediate Hurling Championship: 2008, 2010
Leinster Intermediate Hurling Championship: 2008, 2009, 2010, 2011
All-Ireland Minor Hurling Championship: 2014
Leinster Minor Hurling Championship: 2013, 2014, 2015

References

1968 births
Living people
Mullinavat hurlers
Kilkenny inter-county hurlers
Hurling managers